Inhabit is the third album by the Christian metal band Living Sacrifice and the final album with bassist/vocalist Darren "D.J." Johnson.  The album was recorded at Believer's Trauma Studios.  Kurt Bachman and Joey Daub of Believer also produced and engineered this album.  It was the final album the band would release while under REX.  The album would later be reissued with new artwork on the band's new label, Solid State Records.

The album was recorded on Alesis digital tape.

Track listing

Credits
Living Sacrifice
Darren "D.J." Johnson – vocals, bass
Lance Garvin – drums
Jason Truby – lead guitar
Bruce Fitzhugh – rhythm guitar

Additional
 Joey Daub – production, engineer, mixing
 Kurt Bachman – production, engineer, mixing
 Wreland Sthim – photography
 Caleb Mitchell – photography
 P. Gavin Morkel – executive producer
 Tyler Bacon – executive producer

References

1994 albums
Living Sacrifice albums
R.E.X. Records albums